The Coma I Group is a group of galaxies located about  away in the constellation Coma Berenices. The brightest member of the group is NGC 4725. The Coma I Group is rich in spiral galaxies while containing few elliptical and lenticular galaxies. Coma I lies in the foreground of the more distant Coma and Leo clusters and is located within the Virgo Supercluster.

The Coma I Group is currently infalling into the Virgo Cluster and will eventually merge with it.

Structure 
The Coma I Group appears to consist of two main subgroups, a denser subgroup centered on NGC 4274 and NGC 4278, and looser one surrounding NGC 4565 as suggested by De Vaucouleurs. However, Gregory and Thompson (1977) found no clear evidence for two distinct subgroups in Coma I. They noted a slight density enhancement around NGC 4274 with the rest of the members of Coma I uniformly distributed to the southeast of this density enhancement. P. Fouque et al. and A. M. Garcia et al. both list the Coma I group consisting of two subgroups centered on NGC 4274 and NGC 4565. Additionally, Gibson et al. suggests that another association, the Coma II Group  which is centered on NGC 4725 is associated with the Coma I Group. In 2000, Ferrarese et al. defined the Coma II Group as containing 5 galaxies, namely NGC 4494, NGC 4562, NGC 4565, NGC 4725, and NGC 4747. Also, it was found that these 5 galaxies which make up the Coma II Group have radial velocities in the narrow range of 1190 to 1395 km/s which is larger than the range of galaxies that are part of the Coma I group which have ranges of 600 to 1000 km/s.

The nearby NGC 4631 Group is sometimes listed in some catalogs as being part of the Coma I Group, while other catalogs list the group as being separate from the Coma I Group.

Members
The table below lists galaxies that have been commonly and consistently identified as group members in the Nearby Galaxies Catalog, the survey of Fouque et al., the Lyons Groups of Galaxies (LGG) Catalog, and the three group lists created from the Nearby Optical Galaxy sample of Giuricin et al.

Other possible member galaxies (galaxies listed in only one or two of the lists from the above references) include IC 3215, IC 3247, MCG 5-29- 66, NGC 4080,  NGC 4150, NGC 4308, NGC 4455, NGC 4509, NGC 4534, NGC 4627, NGC 4631, NGC 4656, NGC 4670, UGC 6900, UGC 7007, UGC 7300, UGC 7428, UGC 7438, UGC 7673, UGC 7916 and UGCA 294.

Nearby groups

See also
 List of Galaxy Groups
 M94 Group
 M96 Group
 Ursa Major Cluster – Another nearby spiral-rich group within the Virgo Supercluster

References

Virgo Supercluster
Coma Berenices
Galaxy clusters
Ursa Major (constellation)
Coma I Group